Midodrine is a vasopressor/antihypotensive agent (it raises the blood pressure).  Midodrine was approved in the United States by the Food and Drug Administration (FDA) in 1996 for the treatment of dysautonomia and orthostatic hypotension.  In August 2010, the FDA proposed withdrawing this approval because the manufacturer, Shire plc, failed to complete required studies after the medicine reached the market. In September 2010, the FDA reversed its decision to remove midodrine from the market and allowed it to remain available to patients while Shire plc collected further data regarding the efficacy and safety of the drug. Shire announced on September 22, 2011, that it was withdrawing completely from supplying midodrine and leaving it to several generics to supply the drug.

Medical uses
Midodrine is indicated for the treatment of symptomatic orthostatic hypotension. It can reduce dizziness and faints by about a third, but can be limited by troublesome goose bumps, skin itch, gastrointestinal discomfort, chills, elevated blood pressure while lying down, and urinary retention. A meta-analysis of clinical trials of midodrine or droxidopa in patients with low blood pressure when standing found that midodrine increased standing blood pressure more than droxidopa but that midodrine but not droxidopa increased the risk of high blood pressure when lying down. Small studies have also shown that midodrine can be used to prevent excessive drops in blood pressure in people requiring dialysis.

Midodrine has been used in the complications of cirrhosis. It is also used with octreotide for hepatorenal syndrome; the proposed mechanism is constriction of splanchnic vessels and dilation of renal vasculature. Studies have not been sufficiently well conducted to show a clear place for midodrine.

Contraindications
Midodrine is contraindicated in patients with severe organic heart disease, acute kidney disease, urinary retention, pheochromocytoma or thyrotoxicosis. Midodrine should not be used in patients with persistent and excessive supine hypertension.

Side effects
Headache, feeling of pressure/fullness in the head, vasodilation/flushing face, scalp tingling, confusion/thinking abnormality, dry mouth, nervousness/anxiety and rash.

Pharmacology

Mechanism of action
Midodrine is a prodrug which forms an active metabolite, desglymidodrine, which is an α1-receptor agonist and exerts its actions via activation of the alpha-adrenergic receptors of the arteriolar and venous vasculature, producing an increase in vascular tone and elevation of blood pressure. Desglymidodrine does not stimulate cardiac beta-adrenergic receptors. Desglymidodrine diffuses poorly across the blood–brain barrier, and is therefore not associated with effects on the central nervous system.

Pharmacokinetics

After oral administration, midodrine is rapidly absorbed. The plasma levels of the prodrug peak after about half an hour, and decline with a half-life of approximately 25 minutes, while the metabolite reaches peak blood concentrations about 1 to 2 hours after a dose of midodrine and has a half-life of about 3 to 4 hours. The absolute bioavailability of midodrine (measured as desglymidodrine) is 93%.

Chemistry
Midodrine is an odorless, white, crystalline powder, soluble in water and sparingly soluble in methanol.

Stereochemistry 
Midodrine contains a stereocenter and consists of two enantiomers, making it a racemate; i.e., a 1:1 mixture of (R)- and (S)-forms:

Synthesis
Acylation of 1,4-dimethoxybenzene with chloroacetyl chloride gives the chloroketone 2. The halogen is then converted to the amine 3 by any set of standard schemes, and the ketone reduced to an alcohol with borohydride (4). Acylation of the amino group in this last intermediate with chloroacetyl chloride affords the amide 5. The halogen is then displaced with azide and the resulting product 6 reduced catalytically to the glycinamide, midodrine (7).

References

External links 

 

Acetamides
Alpha-1 adrenergic receptor agonists
Cardiac stimulants
CYP2D6 inhibitors
Peripherally selective drugs
Phenol ethers
Phenylethanolamines
Prodrugs